Raisarri رئیساڑی is one of many tribes that reside in Balochistan-former Brahui Ranges Kalat state. They speak the Brahui language in Mastung and Bolan and Pashto language in Ziarat and Thal-Chotiali Dukki.

The Raisarri-رئیساڑی tribal chief is called the Chief of Sarawan from the princely state of Kalat-Brahui Ranges. 
The present Chief of Sarawan is Nawab Muhammad Aslam Khan Raisarri-رئیساڑی.
During the rivalry war in 1987 between Raisarri and Rind tribe, both sides faced hundreds of casualties. Shaheed Nawabzada Mir Ismail Raisarti, Shaheed Nawabzada Mir Siraj Khan Raisarri, and their father Nawab Ghous Bakhsh Raisarri are recalled as martyrs of Raisarri رئیساڑی tribe.

Few of the most recognized personalities from Raisarri tribe are Nawabzada Aminullah Khan Raisarri the Eldest Son of Nawab Ghaus Bakhsh Raisani (Former Ambassador of Pakistan to Lebanon, Syria and Oman, High Commissioner of Pakistan to Cyprus). Nawab Aslam Raisarri (Former CM Balochistan (2008-2013), Current Member of Provincial Assembly of Balouhistan), Lashkari Raisarri because of his political career and a   mind he has a unique position in the family.

Raisarri tribe is most populated in Quetta, Mastung, Ziarat, Thal-Chotiali and then Kanak which is their mainland. Although some people of the tribe still live in different regions of Balochistan and Sindh .

Their forefathers are also known for their political power even before Pakistan came into existence to this date being second to Khan in Brahui governing system of Meeri-Kalat, they had great relations with the Britishbecause of their tribal and political position in Kalat state. Since the late Nawab Bahadur Sir Asadullah Khan Raisarri was specially requested to join as Knight Commander of The British Council.

The principal sections into which the tribe is divided are the Laskharizai, Ráhusainzai, Rustamzai, Sirajzai, Sahizai and Jamalzai. Each section is named after brothers and sons of the tribe's founding members.

The Raisani are a clan of the tareen tribe

References

Bibliography
1. Braui wa Balouch by Nazir shakar Brahui
2. Speeches on Brahui History by Professor Muhammad Afzal Brohi on his youtube chanel

Brahui tribes